This is a list of Chinese football transfers for the 2016 season summer transfer window. The transfer window opened on 21 June 2016 and closed on 15 July 2016.

Super League

Beijing Guoan

In:

 

Out:

Changchun Yatai

In:

 
 
 

Out:

Chongqing Lifan

In:

 

Out:

Guangzhou Evergrande Taobao

In:

 
  
 

Out:

Guangzhou R&F

In:
 
 

 

Out:

Hangzhou Greentown

In:

 
 

Out:

Hebei China Fortune

In:

 

Out:

Henan Jianye

In:

 

Out:

Jiangsu Suning

In:

 
 
 
 
 

Out:

Liaoning FC

In:

 
 

Out:

Shandong Luneng Taishan

In:

 
 

 
 
 
 
 
 

Out:

Shanghai Greenland Shenhua

In:

Out:

Shanghai SIPG

In:

Out:

Shijiazhuang Ever Bright

In:

 
 
 
 

 

Out:

Tianjin Teda

In:

 
 

Out:

Yanbian Funde

In:

Out:

League One

Beijing BG

In:

 

 

Out:

Beijing Renhe

In:

 

Out:

Dalian Transcendence

In:

 

Out:

Dalian Yifang

In:

 

Out:

Guizhou Hengfeng Zhicheng

In:

Out:

Hunan Billows

In:
 

Out:

Meizhou Kejia

In:

 

Out:

Nei Mongol Zhongyou

In:

Out:

Qingdao Huanghai

In:

 

Out:

Qingdao Jonoon

In:

Out:

Shanghai Shenxin

In:

 

Out:

Shenzhen F.C.

In:

 
 
 

Out:

Tianjin Quanjian

In:

Out:

Wuhan Zall

In:

 
 

Out:

Xinjiang Tianshan Leopard

In:

Out:

Zhejiang Yiteng

In:

 

Out:

League Two

North League

Baoding Yingli ETS

In:

Out:

Baotou Nanjiao

In:

Out:

Beijing BIT

In:

Out:

Hebei Elite

In:

 

Out:

Heilongjiang Lava Spring

In:

Out:

Jiangsu Yancheng Dingli

In:

Out:

Shenyang Dongjin

In:

Out:

Shenyang Urban

In:

Out:

Tianjin Huochetou

In:

Out:

Yinchuan Helanshan

In:

 

Out:

South League

Chengdu Qbao

In:

 

Out:

Hainan Boying & Seamen

In:

 

Out:

Jiangxi Liansheng

In:

 

Out:

Lijiang Jiayunhao

In:

Out:

Meizhou Meixian Hakka

In:

Out:

Nantong Zhiyun

In:

Out:

Shanghai JuJu Sports

In:

Out:

Shenzhen Renren

In:

Out:

Sichuan Longfor

In:

  
 

Out:

Suzhou Dongwu

In:

Out:

References

2015
2016 in Chinese football
China